Lindsay Williams can refer to:

 Lindsay Williams (canoeist) (born 1946), British canoeist
 Lindsay Williams (cricketer) (1933-2008), New Zealand cricketer
 Lindsay Williams (cross-country skier) (born 1984), American cross-country skier